Leticia Socorro Userralde Gordillo (born 28 January 1961) is a Mexican politician from the National Action Party. From 2003 to 2006 she served as Deputy of the LIX Legislature of the Mexican Congress representing the State of Mexico.

References

1961 births
Living people
Politicians from the State of Mexico
Women members of the Chamber of Deputies (Mexico)
National Action Party (Mexico) politicians
Deputies of the LIX Legislature of Mexico
Members of the Chamber of Deputies (Mexico) for the State of Mexico